Dimboola is a 1973 film. It is a filmed recording of a performance of Jack Hibberd's play of the same name by the Australian Performing Group at The Pram Factory.

Cast
Bruce Spence
Fay Mokotow
Wilfred Last
Rosslyn de Winter
Tim Robertson
Jan Friedl
Charles Kemp
Robert Meldrum
Evelyn Krape
Peter Cummins
Jude Kuring
Eileen Chapman
Bill Garner
Kerry Dwyer
Jack Charles
Max Gillies

Production
The film was shot during an actual performance at the Pram Factory, Carlton, Melbourne on the evening of 22 May 1973.

External links
Dimboola at Oz Movies

1973 films
Australian comedy-drama films
Australian films based on plays
1970s English-language films
1970s Australian films